Newcastle Transport is a public transport operator in Newcastle, New South Wales. A subsidiary of Keolis Downer, it operates bus, ferry and light rail services under contract to Transport for NSW.

History and operations
    

In November 2015, the Government of New South Wales announced its intention to contract out the operation of Newcastle Buses & Ferries services to the private sector. Keolis Downer and a Transit Systems/UGL Rail consortium announced their intentions to bid. In December 2016, a ten-year contract was awarded to Keolis Downer effective from 1 July 2017.

Ticketing
All public transport services under Newcastle Transport utilise the Opal ticketing system.

Services

Bus

In January 2018, the bus route network was completely redesigned with the number of routes reduced from 27 to 21.

Newcastle Transport commenced operations with a fleet of 172 MAN, Mercedes-Benz and Volvo buses.

Ferry

Newcastle Transport operates a passenger ferry service that takes five minutes to cross the Hunter River between Queens Wharf and Stockton. The 1986 built ferries are MV Hunter and MV Shortland.

Light rail

Newcastle Transport operates the Newcastle Light Rail between Newcastle Interchange and Newcastle Beach station in Newcastle East with six CAF Urbos 3 trams. The light rail opened in February 2019.

References

Australian companies established in 2017
Bus companies of New South Wales
City of Lake Macquarie
Ferry companies of New South Wales
Keolis
Transport companies established in 2017
Transport in Newcastle, New South Wales
Transport in the Hunter Region